Rasputin (French: La Tragédie impériale) is a 1938 French historical film directed by Marcel L'Herbier and starring Harry Baur, Marcelle Chantal and Pierre Richard-Willm. It depicts the rise and fall of the Russian mystic Grigori Yefimovich Rasputin, the advisor to the Romanov royal family. The film's sets were designed by the art director Guy de Gastyne.

Cast 
 Harry Baur as Rasputin
 Marcelle Chantal as Tsarine Alexandra
 Pierre Richard-Willm as Comte Igor Kourloff 
 Jean Worms as Tsar Nicholas II
 Jany Holt as Groussina 
 Jacques Baumer as Prokoff 
 Georges Malkine as Beggar 
 Lucien Nat as Ostrowski 
 Carine Nelson as Ania Kitina 
 Palau as Piotr 
 Georges Prieur as Grand-Duc Nikolaievich 
 Alexandre Rignault as Bloch 
 Gabrielle Robinne as Tsarine-mère 
 Martial Rèbe as Iliodore 
 Denis d'Inès as Évèque Gregorian 
 Georges Vitray as Ivanov 
 André Gabriello as Stankevitch 
 Joffre as L'archimandrite 
 Georges Paulais as Un quémandeur 
 Léon Larive as Le pope 
 Georges Bever as Le servant du pope 
 Jean Claudio as Le tsarevitch 
 Marcel Barencey as Membre du Saint-Synode 
 Marguerite Templey as La générale 
 Ginette Gaubert as Princesse Dolgoroukine 
 Paul Escoffier as Médecin de la cour 
 Suzanne Devoyod as La supérieure du couvent 
 Lucien Hector as L'homme de la mobilisation 
 Robert Moor as Maître-d'hôtel d'Ania 
 Génia Vaury as Nadia 
 Cécile Didier as Maria 
 Mady Berry as  Dounia 
 Zélie Yzelle as Une paysanne 
 Valentine Camax as Une religieuse 
 Colette Régis as Une religieuse 
 Lucien Pascal as Le politicien 
 Roger Blin as Le jeune paysan 
 Alexandre Mihalesco as Le prédicateur 
 Albert Brouett as Un solliciteur 
 Georges Morton as Un solliciteur 
 Albert Malbert as Le policier

References

Bibliography
 Kennedy-Karpat, Colleen. Rogues, Romance, and Exoticism in French Cinema of the 1930s. Fairleigh Dickinson, 2013.

External links

1937 films
1930s historical drama films
French historical drama films
1930s French-language films
Films directed by Marcel L'Herbier
Films based on German novels
Films set in Russia
Films set in the 1910s
Films scored by Darius Milhaud
Films about Grigori Rasputin
Biographical films about Russian royalty
Cultural depictions of Nicholas II of Russia
French black-and-white films
1937 drama films
1938 drama films
1938 films
1930s French films